The 34th annual Toronto International Film Festival (TIFF) was held in Toronto, Ontario, Canada between September 10 and September 19, 2009. The opening night gala presented the Charles Darwin biography Creation. The Young Victoria, based on the early years of Queen Victoria, closed the festival on September 19.

About the 2009 Festival
TIFF is a non-profit organization whose goal is to change the way people look at the world through film.  The festival is Canada's largest film festival, receiving 4,209 submissions in 2008.  Of this total, 312 films were screened coming from 64 different countries.  TIFF creates an annual economic impact of $135 million CAD.  Aided by over 2,000 volunteers, 100 full-time staff members and 500 seasonal or part-time staff are responsible for organizing the festival.  Two screenings of each of the invited films are presented to the public and at least one screening is provided for press and industry.  The 2009 festival contained 19 different Programmes, or categories of films.  After the ten days of film, the Awards reception was held at Intercontinental Hotel on Front Street in Toronto.

Perhaps the most prestigious of the awards was bestowed to Lee Daniels's Precious: based on the novel Push by Sapphire.  This award was the 2009 Cadillac People's Choice Award and is based solely on votes by Festival audiences.  This award carries a $15,000 cash prize and also comes with a custom made award from Cadillac.  It is widely considered to be the most prestigious because it has had the greatest impact on audiences and inspires film distributors to sign the winning film for larger international releases.  Last year's winner Slumdog Millionaire directed by Danny Boyle, went on to reap huge international spotlight which culminated at the 2009 Academy Awards where it won Best Picture. Lee Daniel's Precious was also a big Oscar contender as it was nominated for Best Picture and Best Director, however it lost to The Hurt Locker and its helmer Katheryn Bigelow.  The First runner-up was Bruce Beresford's Mao's Last Dancer and the second runner-up was Jean-Pierre Jeunet's Micmacs.

The City of Toronto and Astral Media's The Movie Network Award for Best Canadian Feature Film went to Cairo Time directed by Ruba Nadda.  Sponsored by Astral Media's the Movie Network and the City of Toronto, this award came with a cash prize of $30,000.

Future endeavors by the TIFF will be aided by the ongoing construction of TIFF Bell Lightbox, a  facility with an estimated annual economic impact of over $200 million.  Complete with 5 cinemas, learning studios, galleries and a rooftop lounge, this will become the hub of TIFF in 2010 when construction is scheduled to be completed.

Controversy over Tel Aviv spotlight
More than 1,500 people, including prominent filmmakers, academics, and writers signed a letter of protest directed at the Toronto International Film Festival regarding its decision to spotlight Tel Aviv and the work of 10 Israeli filmmakers.  The protest leaders emphasized that it is not a call for a boycott.  The original protest letter in part reads:"As members of the Canadian and international film, culture and media arts communities, we are deeply disturbed by [TIFF's] decision to host a celebratory spotlight on Tel Aviv.  We protest that TIFF, whether intentionally or not, has become complicit in the Israeli propaganda machine. We do not protest the individual Israeli filmmakers included in City to City, nor do we in any way suggest that Israeli films should be unwelcome at TIFF. However, especially in the wake of this year's brutal assault on Gaza, we object to the use of such an important international festival in staging a propaganda campaign on behalf of what South African Archbishop Desmond Tutu, former US President Jimmy Carter, and UN General Assembly President Miguel d'Escoto Brockmann have all characterized as an apartheid regime."

The signatories and supporters include Ken Loach, David Byrne, Naomi Klein, Alice Walker, Jane Fonda, Wallace Shawn, Danny Glover, John Greyson, Viggo Mortensen and the American Jewish group Jewish Voice for Peace.

John Greyson's letter of protest highlighted an interview "Israeli Consul General Amir Gissin gave to Canadian Jewish News in which he described the TIFF spotlight as a culmination of his year-long Brand Israel campaign, which included ads on buses, radio and television." Greyson claims that "This isn't the right year to celebrate Brand Israel, or to demonstrate an ostrich-like indifference to the realities (cinematic and otherwise) of the region, or to pointedly ignore the international economic boycott campaign against Israel."

The protest letter was met with condemnation by some, such as Simcha Jacobovici, "a Toronto filmmaker who recently moved with his family to Israel, noted in a statement that the Palestinian government in Gaza had recently called a U.N. proposal to teach the Holocaust in Palestinian schools a war crime."  Jacobovici asked "Why does [protest supporter John Greyson] want to align himself with Holocaust deniers?"  Others accused those who signed the protest letter as engaging in a boycott of Israel films.

Rabbi Marvin Hier, the founder of the Simon Wiesenthal Center, has stated that "it is clear that the script [the protesters] are reading from might as well have been written by Hamas."

Patrick Goldstein, writing in the Los Angeles Times, wrote against the protest and made an analogy to actions by musician Paul Simon:
"At the height of apartheid in South Africa, Paul Simon made "Graceland", an album of glorious music with South African musicians. He was criticized at the time for breaking a worldwide cultural boycott, but Simon believed that exposing the musicians' gifts to the world far outweighed any tacit endorsement his use of South African musicians would have provided for the country's repressive regime.  History long ago proved him right. The same openness should apply to a film festival."

In response to the protest, a number of Hollywood stars circulated a counter-protest letter on September 15, 2009.  This letter,  which appeared simultaneously in the Los Angeles Times and the Toronto Star, included signatories Jerry Seinfeld, Sacha Baron Cohen, Natalie Portman, Jason Alexander, Lisa Kudrow, Lenny Kravitz, Patricia Heaton, Jacob Richler, Noah Richler, George F. Walker and Moses Znaimer. The letter said:Anyone who has actually seen recent Israeli cinema, movies that are political and personal, comic and tragic, often critical, knows they are in no way a propaganda arm for any government policy. Blacklisting them only stifles the exchange of cultural knowledge that artists should be the first to defend and protect.

Jane Fonda, in a posting on Huffington Post, says that she now regrets some of the language used in the original protest letter and how it "was perhaps too easily misunderstood. It certainly has been wildly distorted. Contrary to the lies that have been circulated, the protest letter was not demonizing Israeli films and filmmakers."  She continued writing "the greatest 're-branding' of Israel would be to celebrate that country's long standing, courageous and robust peace movement by helping to end the blockade of Gaza through negotiations with all parties to the conflict, and by stopping the expansion of West Bank settlements. That's the way to show Israel's commitment to peace, not a PR campaign. There will be no two-state solution unless this happens."

Awards

Programmes

Special presentations
 Baaria by Giuseppe Tornatore
 Bad Lieutenant: Port of Call New Orleans by Werner Herzog
 The Boys are Back by Scott Hicks
 Bright Star by Jane Campion
 Broken Embraces by Pedro Almodóvar
 Cairo Time by Ruba Nadda
 Capitalism: A Love Story by Michael Moore
 City of Life and Death by Lu Chuan
 Cracks by Jordan Scott
 Defendor by Peter Stebbings
 An Education by Lone Scherfig
 The Front Line by Renato De Maria
 Glorious 39 by Stephen Poliakoff
 Good Hair by Jeff Stilson
 The Good Heart by Dagur Kari
 Hadewijch by Bruno Dumont
 Harry Brown by Daniel Barber
 The Hole by Joe Dante
 Hugh Hefner: Playboy, Activist and Rebel by Brigitte Berman
 I Killed My Mother by Xavier Dolan
 The Informant! by Steven Soderbergh
 The Invention of Lying by Ricky Gervais and Matthew Robinson
 The Joneses by Derrick Borte
 Kamui by Yoichi Sai
 L'affaire Farewell by Christian Carion
 Leaves of Grass by Tim Blake Nelson
 Les derniers jours du monde by Arnaud Larrieu and Jean-Marie Larrieu
 Life During Wartime by Todd Solondz
 London River by Rachid Bouchareb
 Mao's Last Dancer by Bruce Beresford
 Moloch Tropical by Raoul Peck
 Mother by Bong Joon-ho
 My Son, My Son, What Have Ye Done by Werner Herzog
 Mr. Nobody by Jaco Van Dormael
 Ondine by Neil Jordan
 Partir by Catherine Corsini
 Perrier's Bounty by Ian Fitzgibbon
 A Prophet by Jacques Audiard
 The Road by John Hillcoat
 Road, Movie by Dev Benegal
 Scheherazade Tell Me a Story by Yousry Nasrallah
 The Secret in Their Eyes by Juan José Campanella
 A Serious Man by Joel Coen and Ethan Coen
 A Single Man by Tom Ford
 Solitary Man by Brian Koppelman and David Levien
 Soul Kitchen by Fatih Akın
 The Traveller by Ahmed Maher
 Triage by Danis Tanovic
 The Trotsky by Jacob Tierney
 Up in the Air by Jason Reitman
 Valhalla Rising by Nicolas Winding Refn
 Vengeance by Johnnie To
 The Vintner's Luck by Niki Caro
 The Waiting City by Claire McCarthy
 Wheat by He Ping
 Whip It! by Drew Barrymore
 Women Without Men by Shirin Neshat
 Youth in Revolt by Miguel Arteta

City to City
 Bena by Niv Klainer
 Big Dig by Efraim Kishon
 Big Eyes by Uri Zohar
 The Bubble by Eytan Fox
 A History of Israeli Cinema - Part 1 by Raphael Nadjari		
 A History of Israeli Cinema - Part 2 by Raphael Nadjari
 Jaffa by Keren Yedaya
 Kirot by Danny Lerner
 Life According to Agfa by Assi Dayan
 Phobidilia by Yoav Paz and Doron Paz

Contemporary World Cinema
 Beyond the Circle by Golam Rabbany
 Blessed by Ana Kokkinos
 Cole by Carl Bessai
 Down for Life by Alan Jacobs
 Excited by Bruce Sweeney
 Eyes Wide Open by Haim Tabakman
 Giulia Doesn’t Date at Night by Giuseppe Piccioni
 A Gun to the Head by Blaine Thurier
 Heiran by Shalizeh Arefpour
 High Life by Gary Yates
 The House of Branching Love by Mika Kaurismäki
 Huacho by Alejandro Fernández Alemendras
 Jean Charles by Henrique Goldman
 Like You Know It All by Hong Sangsoo
 Lourdes by Jessica Hausner
 Men on the Bridge by Asli Özge
 My Year Without Sex by Sarah Watt
 Passenger Side by Matt Bissonnette
 Police, Adjective by Corneliu Porumboiu
 Rabia by Sebastián Cordero
 Sawasdee Bangkok by Wisit Sasanatieng
 Shameless by Jan Hřebejk
 Slovenian Girl by Damjan Kozole
 Suck by Robert Stefaniuk
 Tanner Hall by Francesca Gregorini and Tatiana von Fürstenberg
 The Time That Remains by Elia Suleiman
 The Wind Journeys by Ciro Guerra

Discovery
 Angel by Margreth Olin
 Applause by Martin Zandvliet
 Bare Essence of Life by Satoko Yokohama
 Beautiful Kate by Rachel Ward
 A Brand New Life by Ounie Lecomte
  by Susanne Schneider
 The Disappearance of Alice Creed by J Blakeson
 Eamon by Margaret Corkery
 Everyday is a Holiday by Dima El-Horr
 Five Hours from Paris by Leon Pruddovsky
 Gigante by Adrián Biniez
 The Happiest Girl in the World by Radu Jude
 Heliopolis by Ahmad Abdalla
 Le Jour Ou Dieu Est Parti en Voyage by Philippe van Leeuw
 Kelin by Ermek Tursunov
 Last Ride by Glendyn Ivin
 The Man Beyond the Bridge by Laxmikant Shetgaonkar
 My Dog Tulip by Paul Fierlinger and Sandra Fierlinger
 My Tehran for Sale by Granaz Moussavi
 Northless by Rigoberto Perezcano
 La Pivellina by Tizza Covi and Rainer Frimmel
 Samson and Delilah by Warwick Thornton
 Shirley Adams by Oliver Hermanus
 Should I Really Do It? by Ismail Necmi
 La Soga by Josh Crook
 Toad's Oil by Kōji Yakusho
 Together by Matias Armand Jordal
 The Unloved by Samantha Morton

Future Projections
 The Butcher's Shop by Philip Haas
 Cathedral by Marco Brambilla
 The Death of Tom by Glenn Ligon
 I'm Feeling Lucky by Samuel Chow
 Teenager Hamlet 2006 by Margaux Williamson
 Utopia Suite by Clive Holden
 When the Gods Came Down to Earth by Srinivas Krishna

Gala Presentations
 Agora by Alejandro Amenabar
 Chloe by Atom Egoyan
 Coco Chanel and Igor Stravinsky by Jan Kounen
 Cooking with Stella by Dilip Mehta
 Creation by Jon Amiel
 The Damned United by Tom Hooper
 Dil Bole Hadippa by Anurag Singh
 Dorian Gray by Oliver Parker
 Get Low by Aaron Schneider
 I, Don Giovanni by Carlos Saura
 The Imaginarium of Doctor Parnassus by Terry Gilliam
 Max Manus by Espen Sandberg and Joachim Roenning
 The Men Who Stare at Goats by Grant Heslov
 Micmacs by Jean-Pierre Jeunet Mother and Child by Rodrigo García
 The Other Woman by Don Roos
  by Matthias Emcke
 Precious by Lee Daniels
 The Private Lives of Pippa Lee by Rebecca Miller
 What's Your Raashee? by Ashutosh Gowariker
 The Young Victoria by Jean-Marc Vallée

Masters
 Air Doll by Hirokazu Kore-eda
 Antichrist by Lars von Trier
 Eccentricities of a Blonde-haired Girl by Manoel de Oliveira
 Hotel Atlantico by Suzana Amaral
 Janala by Buddhadeb Dasgupta
 The Legacy by Bernard Émond
 Wild Grass by Alain Resnais

Midnight Madness
 Bitch Slap by Rick Jacobson
 Daybreakers by Michael Spierig and Peter Spierig
 Survival of the Dead by George A. Romero
 Jennifer's Body by Karyn Kusama
 The Loved Ones by Sean Byrne
 Ong Bak 2 by Tony Jaa and Panna Rittikrai
 [REC 2] by Jaume Balagueró and Paco Plaza
 Solomon Kane by Michael J. Bassett
 Symbol by Hitoshi Matsumoto
 A Town Called Panic by Stéphane Aubier and Vincent Patar

Reel to Reel
 The Art of the Steal by Don Argott
 Bassidji by Mehran Tamadon
 Cleanflix by Andrew James and Joshua Ligairi
 Collapse by Chris Smith
 Colony by Carter Gunn and Ross McDonnell
 Genius Within: The Inner Life of Glenn Gould by Peter Raymont and Michele Hozer
 Google Baby by Zippi Brand Frank
 How to Fold a Flag by Michael Tucker and Petra Epperlein
 L' Enfer de Henri-Georges Clouzot by Serge Bromberg and Ruxandra Medrea
 The Most Dangerous Man in America: Daniel Ellsberg and the Pentagon Papers by Judith Ehrlich and Rick Goldsmith
 Petropolis: Aerial Perspectives on the Alberta Tar Sands by Peter Mettler
 Presumed Guilty by Roberto Hernández and Geoffrey Smith
 Reel Injun by Neil Diamond
 Schmatta: Rags to Riches to Rags by Marc Levin
 Snowblind by Vikram Jayanti
 Stolen by Violeta Ayala and Dan Fallshaw
 The Topp Twins by Leanne Pooley
 Videocracy by Erik Gandini

Vanguard
 Accident by Soi Cheang
 The Ape by Jesper Ganslandt
 Bunny and the Bull by Paul King
 Carcasses by Denis Côté
 The Dirty Saints by Luis Ortega
 Enter the Void by Gaspar Noé
 Fish Tank by Andrea Arnold
 Hipsters by Valery Todorovsky
 The Misfortunates by Felix Van Groeningen
 Leslie, My Name Is Evil by Reginald Harkema
 My Queen Karo by Dorothée van den Berghe
 Spring Fever by Lou Ye
 The White Stripes Under Great White Northern Lights by Emmett Malloy

Visions
 Between Two Worlds by Vimukthi Jayasundara
 Face by Tsai Ming-liang
 Gaia by Jason Lehel
 Hiroshima by Pablo Stoll
 Independencia by Raya Martin
 I Am Love by Luca Guadagnino
 Irene by Alain Cavalier
 Karaoke by Chris Chong
 Lebanon by Samuel Maoz
 Nymph by Pen-Ek Ratanaruang
 To Die Like a Man by João Pedro Rodrigues
 To the Sea Pedro González-Rubio
 Trash Humpers by Harmony Korine

Short Cuts
 5 Dysfunctional People in a Car, Pat Mills
 75 El Camino, Sami Khan
 The Armoire, Jamie Travis
 Big Head, Dylan Akio Smith
 La Chute, Ivan Grbovic
 Covered, John Greyson
 Danse Macabre, Pedro Pires
 De Mouvement, Richard Kerr
 Deadman, Chelsea McMullan
 Edge of the Desert, Lea Nakonechny
 Fish in Barrel, Randall Okita
 Found, Paramita Nath
 A Hindu's Indictment of Heaven, Dev Khanna
 Homeland Security, Isaac Cravit
 IKW, Caroline Monnet
 Interview with the Earth, Nicolás Pereda
 The Island, Trevor Anderson
 Léger problème, Hélène Florent
 Life Begins (La vie commence), Émile Proulx-Cloutier
 M, Félix Dufour-Laperrière
 Man v. Minivan, Spencer Maybee
 My Toxic Baby, Min Sook Lee
 Naissances, Anne Émond
 Night Mayor, Guy Maddin
 On a Lonely Drive, Igor Drljaca
 Out in That Deep Blue Sea, Kazik Radwanski
 Pointless Film, Peter Wellington
 Record, Dylan Reibling
 Runaway, Cordell Barker
 Sixty Seconds of Regret, Ed Gass-Donnelly
 Smoke, Nikos Theodosakis and Linda Theodosakis
 Snow Hides the Shade of Fig Trees, Samer Najari
 Soap, Dusty Mancinelli
 The Spine, Chris Landreth
 Swimming Lesson, Caitriona Cantillon
 The Translator, Sonya Di Rienzo
 Tungijuq, Félix Lajeunesse and Paul Raphaël
 Unlocked, Mio Adilman
 Vive la rose, Bruce Alcock
 Volta, Ryan Mullins
 Vs., Ben Bruhmuller

Canada's Top Ten
TIFF's annual Canada's Top Ten list, its national critics and festival programmers poll of the ten best feature and short films of the year, was released in December 2009.

Feature filmsCairo Time — Ruba NaddaCarcasses — Denis CôtéCrackie — Sherry WhiteDefendor — Peter StebbingsI Killed My Mother (J'ai tué ma mère) — Xavier DolanThe Legacy (La Donation) — Bernard ÉmondPassenger Side — Matt BissonnettePolytechnique — Denis VilleneuveThe Trotsky — Jacob TierneyThe Wild Hunt — Alexandre Franchi

Short filmsThe Armoire — Jamie TravisThe Cave — Helen Haig-BrownDanse Macabre — Pedro PiresFive Hole: Tales of Hockey Erotica — Cam ChristiansenLife Begins (La Vie commence) — Émile Proulx-CloutierNaissances — Anne ÉmondOut in That Deep Blue Sea — Kazik RadwanskiRunaway — Cordell BarkerThe Spine — Chris LandrethVive la rose — Bruce Alcock

References

External links
 Official site
 1,500 Artists and Writers Sign Letter Protesting Toronto Film Festival Decision to Spotlight Tel Aviv - video report by Democracy Now!''
 IMDB page, showing award-winners.
 2009 Toronto International Film Festival at IMDb

2009 in Canadian cinema
2009
2009 film festivals
2009 in Toronto
2009 festivals in North America